Dominic Stricker was the defending champion but lost in the first round to Jurij Rodionov.

Luca Nardi won the title after defeating Leandro Riedi 4–6, 6–2, 6–3 in the final.

Seeds

Draw

Finals

Top half

Bottom half

References

External links
Main draw
Qualifying draw

Challenger Città di Lugano - 1